The 2007 Northeast Grand Prix was the sixth round of the 2007 American Le Mans Series season.  It took place at Lime Rock Park on July 7, 2007.

Official results
Class winners in bold.  Cars failing to complete 70% of winner's distance marked as Not Classified (NC).

Statistics
 Pole Position - #7 Penske Racing - 0:44.659 (Qualifying rained out, grid set by practice times)
 Fastest Lap - #6 Penske Racing - 0:45.371

External links
  

N
Northeast Grand Prix
Grand